Romanovsky (masculine), Romanovskaya (feminine), or Romanovskoye (neuter) may refer to:
Romanovsky (surname)
Romanovsky District, name of several districts in Russia
Romanovsky (rural locality) (Romanovskaya, Romanovskoye), name of several rural localities in Russia
Romanovskoye, Kyrgyzstan, a town in Kyrgyzstan